Bonfim is a municipality in the Brazilian state of Minas Gerais.

References

Bonfim
Populated places established in 1860